Sino-Korean War is used to refer to:

Sino-Korean War (610–614), otherwise known as the Goguryeo–Sui War
Sino-Korean War (645–647), otherwise known as the First Goguryeo–Tang War
Sino-Korean War (660–668), otherwise known as the Second Goguryeo–Tang War

The term may also refer to any of the other military conflicts between historical Chinese and Korean states:

Gojoseon–Yan War (late 4th century BC)
Gojoseon–Han War (109–108 BC)
Goguryeo–Wei War (224–245)
Baekje-Tang War (660-663)
Silla–Tang War (670–676)
Goryeo–Khitan War (993–1019)
Later Jin invasion of Joseon (1627)
Qing invasion of Joseon (1636-1637)
Korean War (1950–1953)

References

China–Korea relations
Wars involving Korea
Wars involving China